Madeleine Phaneuf (born 29 April 1995 in Fairfax, Virginia) is an American biathlete.

Biathlon results
All results are sourced from the International Biathlon Union.

World Championships

World Cup

References

1995 births
Living people
American female biathletes
21st-century American women